Kellen M. Davis (born October 11, 1985) is a former American football tight end. He was drafted by the Chicago Bears in the fifth round of the 2008 NFL Draft. He played college football at Michigan State.

College career
Davis was ranked among the nation's top 10 tight ends as a high school senior. He played college football at Michigan State, appearing in 43 games with 22 starts. He was an All Big-Ten honorable mention as a senior and totaled 60 receptions for 789 yards and 9 touchdowns over his career. He was also notable for playing on all three units (offense, defense and special teams) during his senior year.

Professional career

2008 NFL Draft

Regarded as the most physically imposing tight end of the 2008 NFL Draft, concerns over his work ethic and pass production caused him to be projected as a mid-round selection

Chicago Bears
Davis was selected in the fifth round, 158th overall, by the Chicago Bears in the 2008 NFL Draft. He caught his first NFL pass (11 yards) and scored his first touchdown versus the Pittsburgh Steelers on September 20, 2009.

While he appeared in all 48 games in his first three seasons in the league, he was limited to 5 starts due to the lack of skills and the presence of Greg Olsen on the roster, a 1st round draft pick in 2007.

Following the trade of Olsen to the Carolina Panthers in 2011, Davis became the starting tight end. He had 18 receptions for 206 yards and 5 touchdowns in the 2011 season. The 18 receptions marked the first time in 17 years that a Bears tight end failed to record 20 catches.

The production of Davis was argued to have been negatively affected by the offensive style of coordinator Mike Martz.

In 2012, Davis struggled with drops, and caught only 19 passes. On March 13, 2013, he was released by the Bears.

Cleveland Browns
On March 22, 2013, Davis signed with the Cleveland Browns. He was released on September 1, 2013.

Seattle Seahawks
On September 11, 2013, Davis signed with the Seattle Seahawks. In the 2013 season, he collected a Super Bowl ring as the Seahawks defeated the Denver Broncos in Super Bowl XLVIII.

New York Giants
Davis signed with the New York Giants on April 4, 2014. He was released during final roster cuts.

Detroit Lions
Davis signed with the Detroit Lions on October 20, 2014. He was waived on November 25, 2014 and re-signed on December 10, 2014

New York Jets
Davis was signed by the New York Jets on March 25, 2015. On March 14, 2016, he was re-signed to a one-year deal. He was waived/injured by the Jets on November 12, 2016, and was placed on injured reserve.

References

External links
New York Giants bio 
Seattle Seahawks bio 
Chicago Bears bio 
Michigan State Spartans bio

1985 births
Living people
People from Adrian, Michigan
Players of American football from Michigan
American football tight ends
Michigan State Spartans football players
Chicago Bears players
Cleveland Browns players
Seattle Seahawks players
New York Giants players
Detroit Lions players
New York Jets players